CFQX-FM (104.1 MHz) is a country radio station in Winnipeg, Manitoba. Owned by Jim Pattison Group, the station currently operates out of studios at 177 Lombard Avenue in downtown Winnipeg. CFQX's transmitter is located in the Rural Municipality of Springfield.

History 
The station went on the air in November 1981 as an easy listening station on 92.9 FM. It changed to the country format in 1986.

In 1987, the station received approval to move from 92.9 FM to 104.1 FM. In 1997, CFQX was granted a license amendment to move from 104.1 FM to 95.3 FM, although the move was never implemented. On September 2, 2011, Astral Media applied to increase CFQX-FM's effective height of antenna above average terrain from 138.4 to 147.5 metres, and by relocating its transmitter site. All other technical parameters will remain unchanged. This application was approved on November 15, 2011.

As a part of Astral Media's sale to Bell Media, the Jim Pattison Group announced a deal on May 16, 2013, to acquire CFQX-FM and CHIQ-FM from Astral and Bell respectively for an undisclosed amount. The sale will give the Jim Pattison Group its first stations in Manitoba, and would make CFQX a sister station to CHIQ. On December 20, 2013, the CRTC approved Jim Pattison's acquisition of CFQX-FM and CHIQ-FM, the acquisition was closed in early 2014.

On May 1, 2021, the Jim Pattison Media Group rebranded and became Pattison Media.

References

External links
 QX104
 
 

Fqx
Fqx
Fqx
Selkirk, Manitoba
Radio stations established in 1981
1981 establishments in Manitoba